The Murrieta Valley Unified School District is the public school system in the city of Murrieta, California. It is the third largest public school district in Riverside County.

High schools

Murrieta Mesa High School

Murrieta Valley High School

Vista Murrieta High School

Murrieta Canyon Academy/Murrieta Options

References

External links
 

School districts in Riverside County, California
Murrieta, California